My Balls and My Word is the debut studio album by American rapper Young Bleed. It was released on January 20, 1998 as planned, through No Limit/Priority Records. Production was handled by Happy Perez, Beats By The Pound and Pimp C, with Master P and C-Loc serving as executive producers. It features guest appearances from Lay-Lo, C-Loc, Master P, Lee Tyme, Lucky Knuckles, Fiend and Mystikal. The album was a success, making it to number 10 on the Billboard 200 and topped the Top R&B/Hip-Hop Albums, selling 210,000 units in its first week and was certified Gold by the Recording Industry Association of America in February 1998.

Track listing

Personnel
Glenn "Young Bleed" Clifton Jr. – main artist
Steven "C-Loc" Carrell – guest artist (tracks: 1, 6, 8, 9, 11), executive producer
Percy "Master P Miller – guest artist (tracks: 1, 2, 7, 8), executive producer
Michael "Mystikal" Tyler – guest artist (track 2)
Chad "Max Minelli" Roussel – guest artist (tracks: 5, 6, 9-11, 14)
Lucky Knuckles – guest artist (tracks: 5, 6)
J-Von – guest artist (tracks: 5, 6)
Lee Tyme – guest artist (tracks: 6, 11)
Richard "Fiend" Jones – guest artist (track 7)
Raymond "Mo B. Dick" Poole – guest artist (track 7), producer (tracks: 2, 7)
Odell Vickers Jr. – guest artist (track 7), producer (track 5)
Nathan "Happy" Perez – producer (tracks: 1, 3, 4, 6, 8-14)
Craig "KLC" Lawson – producer (tracks: 1, 2, 8)
Craig Bazile – producer (track 2)
Chad "Pimp C" Butler – producer (track 2)
Pen & Pixel Graphics – artwork
Omni Color – design
Dave Weiner – A&R
Duffy Rich – A&R
Kevin Faist – A&R

Charts

Weekly charts

Year-end charts

Certifications

See also
List of Billboard number-one R&B albums of 1998

References

External links

1998 debut albums
Albums produced by Happy Perez
No Limit Records albums
Priority Records albums
Young Bleed albums